Euthyatira lorata is a moth of the  family Drepanidae. It is found in wet coastal forests in north-western North America, including Oregon and Washington.

The wingspan is about 44 mm. Adults are on wing from spring to early summer.

The larvae feed on the foliage of dogwoods (Cornus species).

References

External links
Images
Macromoths of Northwest Forests and Woodlands

Thyatirinae
Moths described in 1881
Moths of North America